Bojan Čečarić (born 10 October 1993) is a Serbian football forward who plays for Napredak Kruševac.

Club career
In the 2019–20 season, he started playing for Cracovia.

Honours
Cracovia
 Polish Cup: 2019–20

References

External links
 
 Bojan Čečarić Stats at utakmica.rs
 

1993 births
Living people
Association football forwards
Serbian footballers
Serbian expatriate footballers
FK Radnički Nova Pazova players
FK Javor Ivanjica players
FK Mladost Lučani players
FK Novi Pazar players
FK Spartak Subotica players
MKS Cracovia (football) players
Korona Kielce players
FK Napredak Kruševac players
Serbian First League players
Serbian SuperLiga players
Expatriate footballers in Poland
Serbian expatriate sportspeople in Poland